Miclea is a Romanian surname. Notable people with the surname include:

 Mircea Miclea (born 1963), Romanian professor and psychologist
 Romulus Miclea (born 1980), Romanian football player

Micle
 Veronica Micle (1850—1889), Romanian poet

See also
 Miclești (disambiguation)
 Micleușeni

Romanian-language surnames